Kahili Adventist School is a pre-K–8 preparatory school in Kapaa, Kauai, Hawaii, United States. Kahili serves all faith backgrounds with a fully accredited K-12 program, affordable tuition, bus service, with a year-round program. It is a part of the Seventh-day Adventist education system, the world's second largest Christian school system.

History
Kahili Adventist School began as Kapaa Mission School in 1938. The school has had several names and several locations since then. In 1984, facing a shortage of space at its Omao school, and responding to island educational needs, a long-term lease was negotiated with the Knudsen Trust to establish a school on the  property in the shadow of Kahili Mountain. Students began attending grades K–8 at the Kahili location in 1986. A building project was completed in several phases over the next few years, with the first phase official opening ceremonies taking place in 1987. The school has continued to grow, remodeling the old lodge for classes and adding additional classrooms and gymnasium. Kahili moved from the Koloa campus in 2014 to the Kapaa location.

The school is a member of the Hawaiian Association of Independent Schools and is accredited by the Hawaii Council of Private Schools, The Board of Regents of the General Conference of Seventh-day Adventists among other accrediting organizations. Kahili is affiliated with Hawaiian Mission Academy on Oahu for the granting of high school diplomas.

Campus

Curriculum
The schools curriculum consists primarily of the standard courses taught at college preparatory schools across the world. All students are required to take classes in the core areas of English, Basic Sciences, Mathematics, a Foreign Language, and Social Sciences.

Spiritual aspects
All students take religion classes each year that they are enrolled. These classes cover topics in biblical history and Christian and denominational doctrines. Instructors in other disciplines also begin each class period with prayer or a short devotional thought, many which encourage student input. Weekly, the entire student body gathers together in the auditorium for an hour-long chapel service.
Outside the classrooms there is year-round spiritually oriented programming that relies on student involvement.

See also

 List of Seventh-day Adventist secondary schools
 Seventh-day Adventist education

References

External links

Educational institutions established in 1938
Adventist secondary schools in the United States
Schools in Kauai County, Hawaii
High schools in Kauai County, Hawaii
Private K-12 schools in Hawaii
1938 establishments in Hawaii